The 2021 Albany Great Danes football team represented the University at Albany, SUNY as a member of the Colonial Athletic Association (CAA) in the 2021 NCAA Division I FCS football season. The Great Danes, led by eighth-year head coach Greg Gattuso, played their home games at Bob Ford Field at Tom & Mary Casey Stadium.

Schedule

References

Albany
Albany Great Danes football seasons
Albany Great Danes football